Cyclomethycaine is a local anesthetic.

References

Benzoate esters
Piperidines